John Gott may refer to:

 John William Gott (1866–1922), last person in Britain to be sent to prison for blasphemy
 Jon Gott (born 1985), gridiron football player
 John Gott (bishop) (1830–1906), Bishop of Truro, 1891–1906
 J. Richard Gott (born 1947), U.S. astrophysicist